Brachodes infanda is a moth of the family Brachodidae. It is found in South Africa.

References

Moths described in 1920
Brachodidae